You'll Never Walk Alone is a compilation album by American singer and musician Elvis Presley, released in 1971 by RCA Records on the RCA Camden budget label. The album contains primarily  previously released gospel recordings by Presley dating back as far as 1957, plus two unissued tracks. The album reached number 69 on the Billboard 200 chart and number 20 on the UK Singles Chart.

In the mid-1970s, RCA Records leased the rights to reissue certain recordings by Presley and other RCA Victor artists on the Camden label to the budget reissue label Pickwick Records. You'll Never Walk Alone was reissued by Pickwick with its original RCA cover art. Following Presley's unexpected death in 1977, demand for his recordings increased dramatically and RCA soon reclaimed the rights to their Camden/Pickwick recordings. You'll Never Walk Alone was first reissued on compact disc in 1987 on the RCA Camden label. RCA reissued the album on CD a second time in 2006 along with most of Elvis' other RCA Camden budget albums. The album was certified Gold on March 27, 1992, Platinum on July 15, 1999, and 3× Platinum on January 6, 2004, by the Recording Industry Association of America.

Content
The single "You'll Never Walk Alone", an adaptation of the Oscar Hammerstein II and Richard Rodgers standard, was a minor hit for him in the late 1960s. Although technically a secular show tune, Elvis and RCA treated it as a religious song, as reflected in the original 1967 single and the fact it was often included on compilations of Presley's religious music, such as this album. 

Two previously unissued recordings are included: "Let Us Pray" from the soundtrack of Presley's 1969 film, Change of Habit and "Who Am I?", a leftover from the early-1969 recording sessions that produced his album From Elvis in Memphis. The title track, and its original single flipside, "We Call on Him", made their vinyl album debut with this release.

The album is a companion to the RCA Camden reissued version of Elvis' Christmas Album, as it contains the four gospel recordings from the original 1957 release of that album, which were omitted from the 1970 RCA Camden reissue. The four gospel songs were first issued in 1957 as an RCA Victor EP titled "Peace in the Valley".

Although there would be further RCA Camden Presley collections, this was the final release that featured previously unreleased tracks. RCA would later release several unissued recordings in its Elvis: A Legendary Performer series beginning in 1974, followed by sporadic releases of previously unreleased recordings in the decades after his death.

The track listing below shows the songs as they appeared on the second CD reissue of this album in 2006. The original 1971 LP omitted "Swing Down Sweet Chariot," taken from the 1960 album His Hand in Mine, though this track was included on UK releases of the album.

Track listing

References

External links

Elvis Presley compilation albums
RCA Records compilation albums
1971 compilation albums
Gospel compilation albums